Damiano Zenoni (born 23 April 1977) is an Italian football manager and former player, who played as a midfielder or defender.

He was capable of playing anywhere in midfield or defence, although he usually played on the right flank as a winger, wing-back, or right-back; he also occasionally played on the left. He is the twin brother of former footballer Cristian Zenoni.

Club career

Early career
Damiano Zenoni began his career with the Atalanta youth side, and was later promoted to the club's senior side. He was initially sent on loan to Pistoiese and Alzano Virescit for the 1996–97 and 1997–98 seasons in order to gain experience and playing time. After helping Atalanta back to the top Italian division, Zenoni made his Serie A debut with Atalanta on 1 October 2000, against S.S. Lazio, and along with his brother, Cristian, established himself as one of the most promising young full-backs in the league throughout the 2000–01 season.

In 2005, he joined Udinese under the Bosman ruling, leaving Atalanta five months before his contract had ended. He signed a four-year deal which would keep him at his new club until 2009. Atalanta promoted Marco Motta from the youth team to the first team to play Zenoni's position.

Parma
In the summer of 2007, Parma signed Zenoni for €3 million in a three-year deal, while Damiano Ferronetti moved to Udinese for €2 million.

Piacenza 
In January 2011, Zenoni joined Piacenza Calcio for the remainder of the 2010–11 season.

International career
Zenoni made his only appearance for the Italian senior team in a 1–0 friendly home win against England on 15 November 2000, under manager Giovanni Trapattoni.

Coaching career
On 7 May 2019, Zenoni was appointed the head coach of Serie C club Feralpisalò, where he already worked with the youth team. On 25 September 2019, he was fired by the club following a 3–1 loss to Fano.

Personal life
Zenoni is the twin brother of former footballer Cristian Zenoni.

References

External links
 uefa.com
 Profile at La Gazzetta dello Sport (2007–08) 

1977 births
Living people
People from Trescore Balneario
Italian footballers
Footballers from Lombardy
Association football fullbacks
Sportspeople from the Province of Bergamo
Italy international footballers
Italy under-21 international footballers
Atalanta B.C. players
U.S. Pistoiese 1921 players
Udinese Calcio players
Parma Calcio 1913 players
Piacenza Calcio 1919 players
Virtus Bergamo Alzano Seriate 1909 players
Serie A players
Serie B players
Serie C players
Italian twins
Twin sportspeople
Italian football managers
Serie C managers